The Limuru Tea Plc is a Kenyan company that is listed on the Nairobi Stock Exchange and engages in the growing of green leaf tea. Founded in 1895, the Company owns 282 hectares of tea land situated four kilometers to the east of Limuru Town.

The Limuru Tea Plc is an out-grower to Unilever Tea Kenya Limited (UTKL). UTKL holds 52% of the issued share capital of  Limuru Tea and acts as the company's managing agent in the growing, manufacturing, sales and marketing of its teas. The Limuru Tea estate green leaf is manufactured in the nearby UTKL’s Mabroukie factory from where it is sold mainly for export.

See also
 Nairobi Stock Exchange
 Unilever

References

External links
 Reuters - Limuru Tea Company Limited
 Rich Management - Limuru Tea Company Limited

Tea companies of Kenya
Companies listed on the Nairobi Securities Exchange